Psara ingeminata is a moth in the family Crambidae. It was described by Edward Meyrick in 1933. It is found in the Democratic Republic of the Congo (West Kasai, Katanga, Bas Congo, Equateur).

References

Pilocrocis
Moths described in 1933
Moths of Africa